The 21st Annual Tony Awards ceremony was broadcast on March 26, 1967, from the Shubert Theatre in New York City on the ABC Television network. This was the Awards ceremony's inaugural broadcast on U.S. network television. The hosts were Mary Martin and Robert Preston. This year marked the first joint presentation of the awards by the American Theatre Wing with The Broadway League (formerly The League of American Theatres and Producers).

The ceremony
Presenters were: Lauren Bacall, Harry Belafonte, Carol Burnett, Marge and Gower Champion, Kirk Douglas, John Forsythe, Jill Haworth, Angela Lansbury, Mayor John V. Lindsay, David Merrick, Zero Mostel, Lynn Redgrave, Lee Remick and Barbra Streisand.

The ceremony featured performances from the following musicals:
 Cabaret ("Wilkommen" – Joel Grey and Company)
 The Apple Tree ("Movie Star"/"Gorgeous" – Barbara Harris and Larry Blyden)
 I Do! I Do! ("Nobody's Perfect" – Mary Martin and Robert Preston)
 Walking Happy ("Walking Happy" – Norman Wisdom and Company)

Award winners and nominees
Winners are in bold

Multiple nominations and awards

These productions had multiple nominations:

11 nominations: Cabaret 
7 nominations: The Apple Tree and I Do! I Do!   
6 nominations: The Homecoming and Walking Happy  
5 nominations: Black Comedy and A Delicate Balance 
3 nominations: A Joyful Noise, The Killing of Sister George and The Wild Duck   
2 nominations: Annie Get Your Gun, A Hand Is on the Gate, Marat/Sade and The School for Scandal  

The following productions received multiple awards.

8 wins: Cabaret  
4 wins: The Homecoming

References

External links
Tony Awards official site

Tony Awards ceremonies
1967 in theatre
1967 awards in the United States
March 1967 events in the United States
Tony Awards